Olukumi may refer to the following:

 Olukumi people
 Olukumi language (also spelled Ulukwumi)